Jean Alexandre Ferdinand Poise (3 June 1828 – 13 May 1892) was a French composer, mainly of opéra-comiques, for which he also frequently wrote the librettos.

Career
Born in Nimes, Poise studied at the Conservatoire de Paris under the tutelage of Adolphe Adam, himself a pupil of Boieldieu. His first opera was "Bonsoir voisin" (1853), which established his career and remains his most enduring success since it is still performed in France and Belgium. He did not follow contemporary operetta trends, but preferred to remain in line with the 18th century opéra comique. Alphonse Daudet was his librettist for Les Charmeurs (1855) and Les Absents (1864).

In 1862, the cantata Nemausa was created, the libretto of which was written by  Le Roi Don Pèdre (1857) and Le Corricolo (1868) were failures, but Poise, drawing inspiration from the works of the late 17th and 18th centuries, went on to create quality works: Les Deux billets (1870) after Florian, Les Trois souhaits (1873) and the trilogy La Surprise de l'amour (1877), L'Amour médecin (1880) and Joli-Gilles (1884). Carmosine was a work that is in a different style from the others.

His contemporary Arnold Mortier portrayed him as "long, emaciated and funereal. Poise, who wrote such vivid and valiant scores, is, I am assured, one of the saddest men in Paris".

Poise died in Paris at age 63.

Works
 Bonsoir voisin, staged on 18 September 1853 at the Théâtre Lyrique
 Les Charmeurs, staged on 17 March 1855 at the Théâtre Lyrique de Paris
 Thé de Polichinelle,staged on 4 March 1856 aut the Bouffes-Parisiens
 Le Roi Don Pèdre, staged on 30 September 1857 
 Le Jardinier galant, staged on 4 March 1861 at the Théâtre national de l'Opéra-Comique
 La Poularde de Caux, staged on 17 May 1861 at the Palais Royal (in collaboration with Bazille, Clapisson, Gautier, Gevaert, Mangeant)
 Les Absents, staged on 26 October 1864 at the Théâtre de l'Opéra-Comique (libretto by Alphonse Daudet)
 Jean Noël, performed in 1865
 Les Moissoneurs (cantata), 15 August 1866
 Le Corricolo, staged on 28 November 1868 at the Théâtre de l'Opéra-Comique à Paris
 Les Deux billets, staged on 19 February 1870 at the Théâtre de l’Athénée
 Les Trois souhaits, staged on 29 October 1873 at the Théâtre de l'Opéra-Comique
 La Surprise de l'amour, staged on 31 October 1877 at the Théâtre de l'Opéra-Comique
 La Cigale et la fourmi, performed in 1877
 La Dame de compagnie, performed in 1877
 L'Amour médecin, staged on 20 December 1880 at the Théâtre de l'Opéra-Comique
 La Reine d'une heure
 Joli-Gilles, performed in 1884
 Le Médecin malgré lui, performed in 1887 in Paris
 Carmosine, performed in 1928 in Monte-Carlo

Bibliography
 David Charlton: "Poise, Ferdinand", in: The New Grove Dictionary of Music and Musicians, ed. Stanley Sadie (London: Macmillan, 1980), vol. 15.

Discography
 Les Absents. With Lina Dachary, Janine Capderou, Gérard Friedmann, Bernard Plantey, orchestra conducted by Pierre-Michel Le Conte: Musidisc 202102 (1CD) (with Joli Gilles).
 Joli-Gilles. With Lina Dachary, Monique Stiot, Raymond Amade, Aimé Doniat, orchestra conducted by Pierre-Michel Le Conte: Musidisc 202102 (1CD) (with Les Absents).
 La Surprise de l'amour. With Monique Stiot, Linda Felder, Gérard Friedmann, Aimé Doniat, orchestra conducted by Jean-Claude Hartemann: Musidisc 201832 (1CD) (with Les rendez-vous bourgeois by Nicolas Isouard)

References

External links
 Works
 
 Kurzbiographie (in French)
 Werke
 

1828 births
1892 deaths
19th-century classical composers
19th-century French composers
19th-century male musicians
Burials at Père Lachaise Cemetery
Conservatoire de Paris alumni
French opera composers
French Romantic composers
People from Nîmes